Unstan may refer to:
 Unstan chambered cairn
 Unstan ware